The Sutphin Boulevard–Archer Avenue–JFK Airport station is a two-level station on the IND and BMT Archer Avenue Lines of the New York City Subway. It is located at the intersection of Sutphin Boulevard and Archer Avenue in Jamaica, Queens.  It is served by the E and J trains at all times, as well as the Z train during rush hours in the peak direction. This station has four tracks and two island platforms, with two platform levels: E trains stop on the upper level while J/Z trains stop on the lower level. 

The station was planned as part of the construction of IND and BMT's Archer Avenue Line as outlined in the Program for Action in 1968. The construction began around 1982 and it was opened to service on December 11, 1988. Originally named Sutphin Boulevard, it served as a replacement for the former Sutphin Boulevard elevated station on the demolished segment of the BMT Jamaica Line two blocks north. In 2003, when the AirTrain JFK opened at the adjacent Jamaica station, the JFK Airport suffix was added.

History 
The plans for the Archer Avenue Lines emerged in the 1960s under the city and MTA's Program for Action. Because of the 1975 New York City fiscal crisis, the Archer Avenue Line's construction was delayed. Design on the station started on October 1, 1974, and was completed on February 24, 1982, by Hellmuth, Obata & Kassabaum. Bids on the station's construction were received on July 9, 1982, and the contract was awarded to Carlin-Atlas Corporation for $17.91 million. Work on the station started on July 15, 1982, and opened along with the rest of the Archer Avenue Line on December 11, 1988.

In 2003, when the AirTrain opened, this station was renamed as Sutphin Boulevard–Archer Avenue–JFK Airport, as the station connects with the AirTrain at Jamaica Station.

In 2020, the MTA announced that it would reconstruct the track and third rail on the IND Archer Avenue Line, which had become deteriorated. From September 19 to November 2, 2020, E service was cut back to Jamaica–Van Wyck, with a shuttle bus connecting to Sutphin Boulevard and Jamaica Center. The MTA then announced it would reconstruct the track on the BMT Archer Avenue Line. Starting on July 1, 2022, J service was cut back to 121st Street, and Z service was temporarily discontinued, with a shuttle bus connecting to Sutphin Boulevard and Jamaica Center. The work was completed in September 2022.

The MTA announced in December 2021 that it would install wide-aisle fare gates for disabled passengers at five subway stations, including Sutphin Boulevard, by mid-2022. The implementation of these fare gates was delayed; the MTA's chief accessibility officer indicated in February 2023 that the new fare gates would be installed at the Sutphin Boulevard–Archer Avenue–JFK Airport and  stations shortly afterward. Additionally, in February 2022, the MTA announced that the IND platform (but not the BMT platform) would receive platform screen doors as part of a pilot program involving three stations. The announcement came after several people had been shoved onto tracks, including one incident that led to a woman's death at another station. The MTA started soliciting bids from platform-door manufacturers in mid-2022; the doors are planned to be installed starting in April 2023 at a cost of $6 million.

Station layout

The Sutphin Boulevard–Archer Avenue–JFK Airport station contains two levels, each with two tracks and an island platform. The E train serves the upper level (IND) at all times. The J and Z trains serve the lower level (BMT); the former operates all times and the latter operates during rush hours in the peak direction. Like the other stations on the Archer Avenue Line, Sutphin Boulevard is fully ADA-accessible.

As with other stations constructed as part of the Program for Action, the Sutphin Boulevard–Archer Avenue–JFK Airport station contained technologically advanced features such as air-cooling, noise insulation, CCTV monitors, public announcement systems, electronic platform signage, and escalator and elevator entrances. This station had six escalators and two elevators when it opened. The station's mezzanine is located above the IND platform under the intersection of Sutphin Boulevard and Archer Avenue.

There are gray vertical acoustic tile side walls and a glassed-in crossover. The mezzanine is glass and stainless steel and features a "Sutphin" mosaic on the geographic north wall. The station's tiling scheme is creme along the platform walls, with some patches of maroon and orange tiling in various places.

Exits

Stairs go up to all four corners of Sutphin Boulevard and Archer Avenue. The two northern staircases go down to an unstaffed fare control area, which  consists of four High Entry-Exit Turnstiles. The full-time fare control area is at the southern end and includes seven regular turnstiles. On the southeast corner, two escalators (one up, one down) and a staircase lead to street level, just outside the Long Island Rail Road (LIRR)'s Jamaica station. Additional staircases lead from street level to each of the LIRR platform. Three elevators provide access to the street level and the LIRR station's main mezzanine areas. Connection is also available to AirTrain JFK, which provides service to John F. Kennedy International Airport; the AirTrain JFK also has its own entrance from the street just south of the LIRR station. As part of upgrades to the Jamaica Transportation Center Station Plaza, two new subway station entrances, with canopies, are planned to be constructed .

Ridership
In 1990, after the Archer Avenue line opened, the station had 2,491,760 boardings. By 2007, the ridership in this station had more than doubled to 6.064 million annual passengers. In 2018, the station had 7,282,128 boardings, making it the 146th most used station in the -station system. This amounted to an average of 23,388 passengers per weekday.

Bus and rail connections

There are connections to the Long Island Rail Road and AirTrain JFK at Jamaica station.

New York City Bus routes  and MTA Bus routes  also stop at the station.

Gallery

References

External links 

 Station Reporter — E Train
 Station Reporter — J Train
 The Subway Nut — Sutphin Boulevard – Archer Avenue – JFK Airport Pictures
 Sutphin Boulevard entrance from Google Maps Street View
 Upper level from Google Maps Street View
 Lower level from Google Maps Street View

Archer Avenue Line stations
Program for Action
Airport railway stations in the United States
New York City Subway stations in Queens, New York
Railway stations in the United States opened in 1988
Jamaica, Queens
New York City Subway transfer stations
John F. Kennedy International Airport
1988 establishments in New York City